Mount Arfak is the highest point in the province of West Papua. It is located on north-east side of the Bird's Head Peninsula. It is a popular hiking area and is the highest peak of the Arfak Mountains. From the summit, Manokwari can be seen. The summit of Mt. Arfak is temperate and dry with very hot, dry summer temperatures that average below 95 °F (35 °C) and mild, humid winter temperatures that average above 38 °F (3 °C). During the winter months, the mountain's summit receives frost usually and sometimes can get to 33 °F (0 °C) every now and then. Sometimes snow can fall on the summit, but not every year. Average rain amount per year is about 45 inches (1150 mm). The mountain is part of the Pegunungan Arfak Nature Reserve, a  protected area that protects parts of the Vogelkop montane rain forests ecoregion. The mountain is also the highest point in the Manokwari metropolitan area.

Gallery

See also

List of Southeast Asian mountains
List of Ultras of Malay Archipelago
List of Ultras of Oceania

References
WWF Bird Watching on Bird's Head, and the Threats to the Region Vogelkop Montane Rain Forests. Accessed 20 May 2011
Arfak Mountains. Accessed 2 March 2015

Mountains of Western New Guinea
Landforms of West Papua (province)
Two-thousanders of Asia